Arlie Max Mucks (December 10, 1891 – July 10, 1967) was an American track and field athlete who competed in the 1912 Summer Olympics.

Biography
In 1912 he finished sixth the discus throw event and 15th in the two handed discus throw competition. In 1916 he added five feet to the college discus record, throwing 145 feet 11 1/2 inches at the Penn Relays. He was inducted in the Wisconsin Athletic Hall of Fame in 1964.

He died in Oshkosh, Wisconsin.

References

External links
list of American athletes

1891 births
1967 deaths
American male discus throwers
American football guards
American male shot putters
Olympic track and field athletes of the United States
Athletes (track and field) at the 1912 Summer Olympics
Wisconsin Badgers football players